Baldric (16 May 1961 – 26 August 1986) was an American-bred, French-trained Thoroughbred racehorse and sire, best known for winning the classic 2000 Guineas in 1964. When racing in Britain, the horse was known as Baldric II. Baldric won twice in 1963 but after being beaten on his three-year-old debut he started a 20/1 outsider for the 2000 Guineas. He won the race, the most valuable ever run in Britain, and went on to win the Prix Perth and the Champion Stakes in Autumn. After two unsuccessful runs in 1965, Baldric was retired to stud where he had success as a sire of winners in both France and Japan.

Background
Baldric was a bay horse with no white markings bred in Kentucky by Howell E. Jackson and Dorothy Jackson's Bull Run Farm. As a two-year-old he was sent to race in Europe where he was trained by the Australian-born Ernie Fellows at Chantilly in France and raced in Dorothy Jackson's colours. His sire, Round Table was one of the most successful grass specialists in American racing history, winning forty-three races and being named Horse of the Year in 1958. He became a highly successful breeding stallion, being the Leading sire in North America in 1972. Baldric's dam Two Cities won one minor race but became a successful broodmare, producing several other winners including the double Pimlico Cup winner Cross Channel. As a descendant of the broodmare Valkyr, Two Cities came from the branch of Thoroughbred family 13-c which produced Black Tarquin and Ferdinand.

Racing career

1963:two-year-old season
As a two-year-old, Baldric won two races including the Prix Tramp at Le Tremblay. He was moved up in class to contest the Prix de la Salamandre over 1400 metres and finished second to the British-bred Kirkland Lake. On his final appearance he finished unplaced in the Grand Critérium at Longchamp Racecourse, having failed to settle for his jockey in the early stages. During his first season, Baldric demonstrated an unruly temperament and was equipped with blinkers by his trainer, who described him as a "crazy" colt.

1964:three-year-old season
On his first appearance of 1964, Baldric dead-heated for second place behind Takawalk in the Prix Djebel at Maisons-Laffitte Racecourse. The colt was then sent to race in Britain for the first time when he contested the 2000 Guineas over the Rowley Mile course at Newmarket. The prize money of all five of the British Classic Races was raised significantly in 1964, and the Guineas was worth £40,302, making it the most valuable race run in Britain up to that time. Ridden by the Australian jockey Bill Pyers, he was not considered a serious contender, and started at odds of 20/1 in a field of twenty-seven runners. Baldric took the lead a furlong from the finish won comfortably by two lengths from Faberge, becoming the fifth successive foreign-trained winner of a British classic.

Baldric was then moved up in distance for the Derby over one and a half miles at Epsom Downs Racecourse. On this occasion, he arrived from France with his own supply of sterilized water, with his assistant trainer explaining that "he doesn't like English water". In contrast to his reputation for unruliness acquired as a two-year-old, Baldric was now being praised in the British press as "a game, resolute colt, full of quality", and one of the few horses capable of defeating the Irish favourite Santa Claus. Starting at odds of 9/1 he took the lead in the straight but tired in the closing stages and finished fifth of the seventeen runners behind Santa Claus. On 5 July Baldric was back in England again for the Eclipse Stakes over ten furlongs at Sandown Park in which he was matched against older horses and finished runner-up to the four-year-old Ragusa.

For his remaining two races of 1964, Baldric was again equipped with blinkers. In late September he was an easy winner of the Prix Perth over 1600 metres Saint-Cloud Racecourse. A month later he ended his season by taking on an international field in the ten furlong Champion Stakes at Newmarket. He started at odds of 7/2 and was ridden by Pyers to a one length victory from the four-year-old favourite Linacre, winner of the Irish 2000 Guineas and Queen Elizabeth II Stakes.

The successes of Baldric, together with Nasram's defeat of Santa Claus in the King George VI and Queen Elizabeth Stakes made Dorothy Jackson the British flat racing Champion Owner in 1964.

1965:four-year-old season
Baldric ran twice as a four-year-old, but failed to recover his best form, as he became increasingly temperamental and difficult to train.

Assessment
The independent Timeform organisation assigned Baldric a peak rating of 131 in 1964. In their book A Century of Champions, based on a modified version of the Timeform system, John Randall and Tony Morris rated Baldric an "average" winner of the 2000 Guineas.

Stud record
Baldric began his stud career in France before being sold and exported to Japan in 1973. The best of his European offspring included the Irish Derby winner Irish Ball and the Irish 1000 Guineas winner Favoletta. He also sired Without Fear (out of Never Too Late) who became a leading sire in Australia. In Japan he sired Kyoei Promise who won the Autumn Tenno Sho and finished second in the Japan Cup in 1983. Baldric died in Japan on 26 August 1986.

Pedigree

Through his dam Two Cities, Baldric was inbred 4 x 4 to Sir Gallahad, meaning that this stallion appears twice in the fourth generation of his pedigree.

References

1961 racehorse births
1986 racehorse deaths
Racehorses bred in Kentucky
Racehorses trained in France
Thoroughbred family 13-c
2000 Guineas winners